A list of films produced by the Tollywood (Bengali language film industry) based in Kolkata in the year 2007.

Highest-grossing
 I Love You

A-Z of films

2007
Lists of 2007 films by country or language
2007 in Indian cinema